André Luciano da Silva (born 27 April 1981, in Aracati), commonly known as Pinga, is a Brazilian former footballer who played as an attacking midfielder.

Club career
Pinga scored 14 goals in 34 games for Al Ahli in the 2010–11 UAE Pro-League campaign. On 2 January 2013 he signed a contract with Brazilian side Santos until May.

References

External links

1981 births
Living people
Brazilian footballers
Brazil under-20 international footballers
Association football midfielders
Ceará Sporting Club players
Esporte Clube Vitória players
Clube Atlético Juventus players
Treviso F.B.C. 1993 players
Torino F.C. players
A.C.N. Siena 1904 players
Sport Club Internacional players
Al Wahda FC players
Al Ahli Club (Dubai) players
Al Dhafra FC players
Santos FC players
América Futebol Clube (MG) players
Expatriate footballers in Italy
Brazilian expatriate footballers
Campeonato Brasileiro Série A players
Serie A players
Serie B players
Qatar Stars League players
Expatriate footballers in Qatar
Expatriate footballers in the United Arab Emirates
Brazilian expatriate sportspeople in the United Arab Emirates
UAE Pro League players
UAE First Division League players
Sportspeople from Ceará